Ali Faik al-Ghabban was Minister of Youth and Sports in the cabinet appointed by the Interim Iraq Governing Council in September 2003 and in the Iraqi Interim Government. A Shia Muslim, al-Ghadban is a supporter of the Supreme Islamic Iraqi Council.

References
 

Government ministers of Iraq
Living people
Year of birth missing (living people)
Islamic Supreme Council of Iraq politicians